C F Booth Ltd is a family-owned scrap metal and recycling business based in Rotherham, South Yorkshire, England.

Operations
Clarence Frederick Booth founded the business in 1920, as a metal purchaser and trader. Over the company's history, there have been a number of associated sites and businesses including: a rail served site in Doncaster (closed); and a site in Aston, near Rotherham, which concentrated on dismantling buses.

Today the company's main site is the Clarence Metal Works, located on the residual southern section of the Sheffield and Rotherham Railway adjacent to the Rotherham Ring Road. Obtained in the 1960s, the railway embankment was removed and the ground level access allowed for easier dismantling of redundant diesel and electric locomotives. This work continues at present, although a number of the vehicles bought are now resold for preservation. Many wagons, carriages, underground and departmental stock are also processed here. C F Booth was involved in one of the most high-profile scrapping contracts for British Rail of all time, with the media descending on the site for the arrival and scrapping of several vehicles from the APT fleet in 1987. Rail vehicles can still be brought in through a connection to Network Rail, although much is now brought in by road. Cable and electrical equipment is also a significant part of the business, but the interest in the railway activities and the proximity of the railway sidings to roads give this side of the business a high profile.

Present
The Clarence Works site is essentially a scrapyard for ferrous and non-ferrous metals, and non-ferrous Melting Shop. The company's gantry cranes and three Derrick cranes make the site quite distinctive.

In 1989 the company introduced a copper alloy melting division, to service the foundry industry with copper-based ingots for re-melting purposes. Today it is one of the largest manufacturers of copper based products in the United Kingdom. The firm also provides machining services on large billet and slab metal sections, which supply customers in the marine, oil and gas and defence industries.

In 2012 the company achieved the Queens Award for International Trade. Company turnover is circa £170 million.

Millmoor

In 1987, Ken Booth bought Rotherham United F.C. out of administration. For 17 years, the Booth family owned the club, with Booth chairman. After the collapse of the ITV Digital deal, and with club debts at £3 million, the family sold the club for a nominal £1 in December 2004 to a group of supporters led by solicitor Peter Ruchniewicz, in returning for gaining ownership of the club's ground at Millmoor (located adjacent to the firms main scrapyard, the Clarence Metal Works), the Tivoli nightclub in front of it and the Hooton Lodge training ground.

The club paid the Booths £200,000 per annum in rent, and were responsible for the grounds maintenance and up keep. The club started a ground upgrade programme, but came into dispute with the Booth's over the lease period and additional fees, which included: 30 free tickets to every home match, with entertainment; advertising in the ground; and first call on away tickets and FA Cup final tickets.

In May 2008, Rotherham United left Millmoor after talks with Ken Booth broke down. The team moved to the Don Valley Stadium in Sheffield until 2012, when the club moved into a new community stadium in Rotherham. Millmoor is currently unused apart from its car park which has been used by C F Booth as an overspill and storage area for former tube trains awaiting scrapping.

Contributions to Railway Preservation
Some of the vehicles passing through the yard have been sold on for preservation. Examples include Class 06 No. D2420/06003 in 1984, Class 08 No. D3861/08694 in 2009, Class 31 No. D5630/31206 in 2006 and Class 50 No. D426/50026 Indomitable in 1993 during Operation: Collingwood.

References

External links

Renewable resource companies established in 1920
Companies based in Rotherham
Privately held companies of England
Family-owned companies of the United Kingdom
Non-ferrous metallurgical works in the United Kingdom
Waste management companies of the United Kingdom
Railway scrapyards in the United Kingdom
1920 establishments in England